Otto Stenberg (born 29 May 2005) is a Swedish professional ice hockey center for Frölunda HC of the Swedish Hockey League (SHL). He is considered one of the top prospects in the 2023 NHL Entry Draft.

Playing career
Stenberg played as youth within hometown club, Stenungsund HF, before moving to join Frölunda HC junior system. In the 2021–22 season, Stenberg had 35 points in 38 games for Frölunda's U20 team.

He made his professional debut with Frölunda HC in the SHL during the following 2022–23 season.

International play
Stenberg represented Team Sweden as captain at the 2022 Hlinka Gretzky Cup, winning a silver medal.

Career statistics

Regular season and playoffs

International

References

External links
 

2005 births
Living people
Frölunda HC players
People from Västra Götaland County
Swedish ice hockey centres
21st-century Swedish people